Cyrtodactylus gansi  is a species of gecko, a lizard in the family Gekkonidae. The species is endemic to Myanmar.

Etymology
The specific name, gansi, is in honor of American herpetologist Carl Gans (1923–2009).

Geographic range
C. gansi is found in Chin State, Myanmar.

Habitat
The preferred natural habitats of C. gansi are forest and freshwater wetlands.

Description

Reproduction
C. gansi is oviparous.

References

Further reading
Bauer AM (2003). "Descriptions of Seven New Cyrtodactylus (Squamata: Gekkonidae) with a Key to the Species of Myanmar (Burma)". Proceedings of the California Academy of Sciences 54: 463–498. (Cyrtodactylus gansi, new species, pp. 475–479, Figures 7–9, Table 3).

Cyrtodactylus
Reptiles described in 2003
Taxa named by Aaron M. Bauer